Ungeria is a monotypic genus of flowering plants belonging to the family Malvaceae. It just contains one species, Ungeria floribunda Schott & Endl. It is also in the Helicteroideae subfamily and Helictereae tribe.

Its native range is Norfolk Island (in the Pacific Ocean near Australia). It is found in Mount Pitt Nature Reserve (part of Norfolk Island National Park).

Description
It has leaves which are broadly elliptic or obovate and evergreen. It has deep pink flowers. The fruits are 5 lobed and star-shaped in cross-section.

Moths of Austrocarea iocephala subspecies millsi  can be found on the tree.

It is related (dna wise) to the Durian.

Taxonomy
It has the common name of 'Bastard Oak', (due to the inferior quality of the timber,) was listed as Vulnerable in 2003 on Norfolk Island. 502 plants were counted in 2003.

The genus name of Ungeria is in honour of Franz Unger (1800–1870), an Austrian botanist, paleontologist and plant physiologist. The Latin specific epithet of floribunda means "many-flowering", (such as Floribunda).
Both the genus and sole species were first described and published in Meletemata Botanica (Melet. Bot.) on page 27 in 1832.
The genus is recognized by the United States Department of Agriculture and the Agricultural Research Service, but they do not list any known species.

Culture
On 14 January 2020, an image of Ungeria floribunda was used on a postage stamp for Australia, one of two 'Norfolk Island Early Botanical Art' stamps.

References

Helicteroideae
Monotypic Malvales genera
Plants described in 1832
Flora of Norfolk Island